Shinola is an American lifestyle brand based in Detroit, Michigan. It produces and sells watches, bicycles, leather goods, clocks, home goods, and jewelry. Founded in 2011, Shinola takes its name from a common saying that harkens back to the defunct Shinola shoe polish company. The company was founded by Tom Kartsotis and is owned and operated by Texas-based investment group Bedrock Group LP.

History

The original Shinola shoe polish brand was founded in Rochester, New York in 1877, and went out of business in 1960. The Detroit-based retail company was founded in 2011 by Tom Kartsotis under his investment company, Bedrock. Kartsotis, previously a founder of Fossil Group, wanted to create a high end American watch manufacturing brand to rival Swiss watchmakers at a lower price point. Bedrock decided to acquire the Shinola brand after an associate used the World War I-era expression "You don't know shit from Shinola" as a rejoinder to Kartsotis' stated ambitions for the company. Unexpectedly, the joke generated a serious discussion about restoring the Shinola brand. Market surveys established that when faced with a choice of paying US$5 for a pen from China, $10 for one made in the United States, and $15 for a pen made in Detroit, consumers would be willing to pay a premium for the last one.

Every Shinola watch is technically assembled in the United States. However, many parts used in Shinola watches are manufactured in Europe, China and Thailand. Certain components' factories are owned by companies based in Switzerland. At the time of the company's founding in 2011, no American watchmaker had produced watches at scale since the late 1960s, with U.S.-based watchmaking relegated to select specialty companies such as RGM in Lancaster, Pennsylvania. Shinola's tagline was "Where American is Made", but that was abandoned after the Federal Trade Commission requested changes in certain marketing and labeling practices. The company has actively utilized Detroit's reputation as a worldwide manufacturing hub in its marketing of the brand.

The company's headquarters and watch factory are housed within the College for Creative Studies (CCS) on the fourth and fifth floors of the Alfred A. Taubman Building in Detroit, a former automotive research lab. Shinola's occupation of the CCS space at first occurred by accident when Bedrock officials, seeking a manufacturing site after resolving to rebuild Shinola, visited the College and the elevator unexpectedly opened on the fifth floor, which was vacant at the time. To build out the watch factory, the company partnered with Ronda, which also brought in expert watchmaking veterans to train Shinola's watch assemblers, all of whom had no prior experience in watchmaking. Currently, the factory has the capacity to finish the assembly of 500,000 watches a year.

Most of the workers assembling watches are local Detroiters, and many of them come from automotive manufacturing. Since the company's founding in 2011, it has grown to over 400 employees as of 2021.

In 2021, Shinola partnered with Crate and Barrel to create a 115-piece furniture line and with the Ford Motor Company to create a concept for the Lincoln Aviator at the Pebble Beach Concours d'Elegance.

Products

Watches

Shinola began by producing watches with quartz analog movements. The company's first watch was released in March 2013. Produced in an edition of 2,500 and available in two sizes, The Runwell Limited Edition 47mm sold out in one week, with the last 40mm watch selling out in under two weeks. The watches sold for US$550, and approximately 35 percent of the sales came from Michigan.

In December 2013, Shinola released its second limited edition watch, The Wright Brothers Limited Edition watch. It is the first watch in the Great Americans Series, which was released in conjunction with a limited edition bicycle. The series has released subsequent watches honoring other Great Americans, including Henry Ford (2014), Muhammad Ali (2015), Maya Angelou (2016), Jackie Robinson (2017), the Statue of Liberty (2018), Minoru Yamasaki (2019) and Motown legend Smokey Robinson (2020). The 2021 collection honors Jake Burton Carpenter, founder of Burton Snowboards.

In September 2014, Shinola released The Lattice, a limited edition wristwatch created in partnership with Oscar de La Renta. The 36mm women’s watch was manufactured in Detroit in a limited edition of 250. Purchase included a hardcover book created exclusively for the project which complements the timepiece by offering an in-depth look at Oscar de la Renta and his work.

In 2014, Shinola released The Black Blizzard titanium wristwatch in 48mm and 42mm as well as the next Signature Series limited editions watch, The Henry Ford Pocket Watch.
The company also produces a number of different watch styles on a non-limited edition basis, including The Birdy, The Gomelsky, The Runwell Chronograph, The Runwell Sport, The Runwell Sport Chrono, The Detrola, Sea Creatures and The Brakeman.

In response to public demand, the company unveiled its first mechanical watch, the Lake Erie Monster, in November 2017. Shinola attributed the delay to the time it took its Swiss suppliers to finish making the mechanical movement. 

In May 2021, Shinola released its first automatic chronograph, the Canfield Speedway.

Bicycles
Shinola bicycles include three models: the single-speed Detroit Arrow, the three-speed Bixby, and The Runwell with an 11-speed internally geared hub. All three bikes were designed by Sky Yaeger, formerly of Swobo, Spot, and Bianchi. The chromoly steel frames and forks are made by Richard Schwinn's Waterford Precision Cycles in Waterford, Wisconsin.

In addition to The Bixby and The Runwell, Shinola produced two limited edition bicycles, including the Wright Brothers Limited Edition Bicycle and The Shinola Runwell Di2 Limited Edition, as well as a one-off Twinn Tandem bicycle and brass-plated Runwell bicycle.

Journals
Shinola sold journals with soft linen and hard linen in partnership with Ann Arbor, Michigan-based Edwards Brothers Malloy, prior to the printer's closure in 2018.

Leather
Shinola's leather goods and leather watch straps are made using leather predominantly supplied by the Chicago-based tannery, Horween Leather, which has been in operation since 1905. The tanning of the leather takes months, using a process that showcases the natural characteristics of the leather. Shinola leather watch straps were once made by Hadley-Roma in Largo, Florida, but are now produced at their factory in Detroit. A partial list of Shinola leather goods includes iPad and iPhone cases, wallets, portfolios, backpacks, and more.

In 2014, Shinola opened its own leather factory in Detroit, and has begun manufacturing leather watch straps under the leadership of Braloba, a Swiss-based, family-owned company run by Thomas Schori. The leather factory is equipped with custom-designed machines produced by Galli S.P.A.

Shinola also sells watch straps individually; leather straps have been sourced from Hadley-Roma in Largo, Florida and Horween Leather in Chicago, and rubber watch straps are made in partnership with Stern Manufacturing of Staples, Minnesota. The company also revived production of shoe polish in 2013, albeit in a different formulation and tin can packaging.

Jewelry and eyewear 
Shinola launched a jewelry line in 2016, with initial pieces designed by New York City designer Pamela Love. In 2021, eyewear was added to the product line with the launch of three styles: the Rambler, the Bixly, and the Mackinac.

Shinola Hotel 

Shinola, in partnership with a Detroit real estate company, opened a 129-room, eight-story boutique hotel as part of a multimillion-dollar development project in January 2019. Located on Detroit's Woodward Avenue, the hotel occupies five buildings including historic structures such as the Singer Building and former T.B. Rayl & Co. shop. It also contains restaurant San Morello and a retail store. In 2021, Shinola Hotel provided lodging for the launch of the "Decked out Detroit" initiative, an effort to highlight local activities and businesses.

Shinola Pet
Shinola Pet was a collection of American-made dog beds, toys, leashes and collars produced in collaboration with photographer Bruce Weber. Shinola Pet supported the Michigan Humane Society and the Best Friends Animal Society in Shinola's mission to raise awareness about rescue organizations and to save pets by finding homes for them. A portion of the pets' toys were produced in partnership with Empowerment Plan, a Detroit-based charity organization that employs local women who are living in shelters, training them to manufacture sleeping bag coats for the homeless.

Retail locations

In addition to the Shinola website, Shinola products are available for sale at flagship stores in Detroit, New York, London, Toronto, Highland Park, Plano, Minneapolis, Chicago, Boston, Los Angeles, San Francisco, Washington, D.C., Cleveland, Columbus, Denver, Waikiki, Ann Arbor, and formerly at King of Prussia.

Criticism

Made in America marketing 
Detroit-based journalist Jon Moy has suggested that the choice of Detroit as the location of Shinola's factory was a calculated act of "opportunistic marketing" intended to yield feelings of nostalgia on a purchaser's part. He  wrote about Shinola: "Shinola is using my city as its shill, pushing a manufactured, outdated and unrealistic ideal of America." That said, the company has invested intensely in its Detroit-based employees, flying in watchmakers from Switzerland to train them, paying significantly above minimum wage and retaining its workforce even as the broader manufacturing sector is criticized for outsourcing," per the Chicago Tribune. Michigan State University economist Lisa D. Cook said that operations like Shinola's factory in the city help fill the void as Detroit's car makers downsize. She said, "We can expect that many different types of novelty products might be produced, ones that require high skills like Shinola watches, and these goods, and goods like them, represent that kind of a comeback."

This marketing technique and Kartsotis's background have brought much attention to the company. In 2014, the men's style site compared Shinola to a "trust fund kid that decided one day he wanted to start a company and had his dad buy him all the cool stuff." In 2013, in a review of its new store in Tribeca, the New York Times described Kartsotis as a "mid-price watch mogul looking to go luxury under the cover of charitable business practices".

In her article "Bougie Crap", for Infinite Mile, Professor Rebekah Modrak writes:

In 2017, Modrak created the web-based artwork RETHINK SHINOLA that, in the words of critic Sarah Rose Sharpe, "lays out the contradictions and racist underpinnings of Shinola’s branding, past and present, and the obliviousness with which the company parlays these damaging practices into present-day Detroit.... The evidence that Modrak has compiled is damning, presenting examples of overtly racist Shinola advertisements from the 1930s, all the way through a shockingly tone-deaf campaign shot by photographer Bruce Weber. Shinola commissioned Weber to photograph supermodel Carolyn Murphy (in her first visit to Detroit) hugging and bicycling with black Detroiters." In June 2016, the Federal Trade Commission ordered the company to stop using "Where American is Made" as a slogan because "100% of the cost of materials used to make certain watches is attributable to imported materials."

Gentrification 

A New York Times article about the brand begins with Kartsotis recalling the dire state of the Cass Corridor neighborhood, and his disbelief that a luxury store could succeed in the area. He even recalls himself asking, "You want to put a store here? You kidding me?" 

Modrak asserted that Shinola “uses the design aesthetic of “calculated authenticity” and elements of hand-craft or personalization to suggest that the product is motivated by these values and not by crass economic gain.” 

Moy accused Shinola of disguising their furthering of gentrification in the city with claims of city pride. He charges: “Shinola and other entrepreneurs market themselves as white knights, swooping in to save the noble savages.” Despite this, Kartsotis claims he is not in the business to make a profit, but rather to stimulate the local economy by paying workers, on average, $3 above minimum wage. 

A Metro Times article commented that Shinola had “seized scrappy Detroit’s comeback story,” which some have called capitalizing on Detroit’s poverty. Moy referenced alleged exploitation of black culture, and that using “photos of adorable black kids with a beautiful, benevolent white woman seem to be the centerpiece of Weber's campaign for the company,” arguing that their marketing enforces their “white savior” image.

Community involvement

In 2014, Shinola partnered with Midtown Detroit, Inc., to open an off-leash dog park in Detroit. 

Following the legalization of recreational marijuana in Michigan, Shinola released the Twenty After Four watch line in partnership with rapper Common and actor Woody Harrelson in 2020. Proceeds from the sale, just over $176,000, were split between two criminal justice charities: the Anti-Recidivism Coalition and Cabrini Green Legal Aide.

In 2021, Shinola produced 1,969 Pride watches to commemorate the 1969 Stonewall riots. The company donated $120,000 of the proceeds to the  LGBT+ nonprofits SAGE Metro Detroit and the Ruth Ellis Center. Also in 2021, the company launched the Most Likely to Succeed watch line, with $40,000 in proceeds going to Money Matters for Youth, a nonprofit that teaches children financial literacy.

Notable customers
Former President Bill Clinton bought 14  Shinola watches, calling the company an American success story.  Other politicians have promoted the product, including former Michigan Governor Rick Snyder and former President Barack Obama. On April 22, 2016, President Obama presented United Kingdom Prime Minister David Cameron with a custom Shinola men's watch featuring the seal of the President of the United States engraved on the back, presented in a wooden Shinola box customized with the Presidential seal.

See also
History of watches
Hamilton Watch Company
Illinois Watch Company
Elgin National Watch Company

Notes

References

External links

 Official website
 Gallery of Vintage Print Advertisements featuring Shinola

American brands
Cycle manufacturers of the United States
Leather goods
Manufacturing companies based in Detroit
Watch brands
Watch manufacturing companies of the United States
Manufacturing companies established in 2011
2011 establishments in Michigan
Retail companies established in 2011